Count Baltzar Bogislaus von Platen (29 May 1766 – 6 December 1829) was a Swedish naval officer and statesman. He was born on the island of Rügen (now in Germany) to Philip Julius Bernhard von Platen, Field Marshal and the Swedish Governor General of Pomerania, and Regina Juliana von Usedom.

Swedish Navy
At age 13 Baltzar entered the Royal Swedish Navy where he served with distinction until resigning in 1800, having attained the rank of captain.

Göta Canal
Following the revolution in 1809 he became a member Government and, in the following year, received a promotion to rear admiral. He was also made chairman of the Göta Canal directorate charged with constructing a canal across Sweden. The canal, following a design by Thomas Telford, would only be completed in 1832, after von Platen's death, but during its construction, he did discover two skilled mechanical engineering brothers John Ericsson and Nils Ericson.

Honors
He was elected a member of the Royal Swedish Academy of Sciences in 1815. He was appointed Governor of Norway on 26 November 1827, a position which he held until his death in Christiania (modern name Oslo), the Norwegian capital, on 6 December 1829.

Burial site
He was married to Hedvig Elisabeth Ekman. Baltzar von Platen's grave is at the side of the Göta Canal in Motala, where it is something of a tourist attraction, especially for canal visitors.

References

1766 births
1829 deaths
People from Swedish Pomerania
Baltzar
Swedish nobility
Swedish people of German descent
Members of the Privy Council of Sweden
Governors-general of Norway
Swedish Navy vice admirals
Members of the Royal Swedish Academy of Sciences
19th-century Swedish businesspeople
19th-century Swedish military personnel
19th-century Swedish politicians